The rivière au Pin (in English: Pine River) is a tributary of the Bécancour River which is a tributary of the south shore of the St. Lawrence River, in Quebec, in Canada.

The Pin River flows successively, in the MRC of:
Arthabaska Regional County Municipality, in administrative region of Centre-du-Québec: in the municipalities of Saints-Martyrs-Canadiens;
Les Appalaches Regional County Municipality (MRC), in the administrative region of Chaudière-Appalaches: municipalities of Saint-Jacques-le- Majeur-de-Wolfestown, Disraeli (parish), Saint-Jacques-le-Majeur-de-Wolfestown, Saint-Julien and Irlande.

Geography 

The main neighboring watersheds of the rivière au Pin are:
 north side: Bécancour River, William Lake;
 east side: Bécancour River, Lac à la Truite, Coleraine River;
 south side: Coulombe North River;
 west side: Blanche River (rivière au Pin tributary), Nicolet River, rivière des Vases, Grimard stream, Bulstrode River.

The rivière au Pin has its source at Sunday Lake in the municipality of Saints-Martyrs-Canadiens. This lake is located north of Mont Louise (Arthabaska), northeast of the village of Saints-Martyrs-Canadiens, north of route 161 and south of Saint-Jacques-le-Majeur-de-Wolfestown.

From Sunday Lake, the Pin River flows on  divided into the following segments:

Upper course of the Pin River (segment of )

  towards the northeast, crossing Breeches Lake, crossing the boundary between the municipalities of Saints-Martyrs-Canadiens and Saint-Jacques-le-Majeur-de-Wolfestown, to the southwest shore of Lake Breeches;
  northeasterly, to its mouth located northeast of the lake;
  towards the north, crossing the boundary between the municipalities of Saint-Jacques-le-Majeur-de-Wolfestown and Disraeli, Quebec (city), to the mouth of the "Mud Pond" which the current has crossed over its full length;
  northward, to the mouth of Petit lac Long;
  towards the northeast, up to the limit between the municipalities of Disraeli and Saint-Jacques-le-Majeur-de-Wolfestown;
  northerly, to the limit between the municipalities of Saint-Jacques-le-Majeur-de-Wolfestown and Saint-Julien.

Lower course of the Pin River (segment of )

From this municipal limit, the Rivière au Pin flows over:

  north to a road bridge;
  northward, to the confluence of Vimy Creek (coming from the north);
  westward, up to the confluence of the Blanche River (coming from the west);
  northward, up to the municipal boundary between Saint-Julien and Irlande;
  north to the road;

The Rivière au Pin flows into a bend in the river on the south bank of the Bécancour River.

Toponymy 

Logging, in particular the essence of pine, contributed to the colonization of the region of Appalachians.

The Rivière aux Pins appears on an 1883 cadastral map of the canton of Ireland.

The toponym Rivière au Pin was made official on December 5, 1968, at the Commission de toponymie du Québec.

See also 

 List of rivers of Quebec

References 

Rivers of Chaudière-Appalaches
Rivers of Centre-du-Québec
Les Appalaches Regional County Municipality
Arthabaska Regional County Municipality